Al-Bassah  is a town in the Amman Governorate in northern Jordan. Known for a Roman-Byzantine architectural remains of a large cave church, and a second church built outside in front of the entrance. Nearby a large cemetery

References

External links
Satellite map at Maplandia.com

Populated places in Amman Governorate